Aquilonis (Latin "of the North Wind") is a classical and choral studio album by the Swedish trio Trio Mediæval. This album was released in the label ECM New Series in June 2014.

Composition
The album is named after a Swedish North Wind. On this album the trio sings Icelandic chant and Italian sacred songs, with performing custom arrangements from old Norwegian folk melodies. The trio also sings some 15th-century English carols, as well as contemporary works by Anders Jormin, William Brooks and Andrew Smith. It's the first time that the trio also plays instruments with their voice on a record.

Reception
James Manheim in his review for All Music says that "This certainly isn't an authentic performance of medieval music." but, he add that "In a way, it gets listeners closer than almost anybody else to the time when vertical sonorities in European music were new, and for those who have never heard it, it's time to begin."In The New York Times's Classical Top Music Recordings of 2014, James R. Oestreich says that "So varied are the sources that it is hard to find a theme or even a common thread. But the enchanting vocal style and sonority that the female trio has evolved unifies the whole beautifully."

Track listing
ECM New Series – ECM 2416 NS.

Personnel
Trio Mediæval:
Anna Maria Friman – voice, Hardanger fiddle, melody chimes
Linn Andrea Fuglseth – voice, portable organ, melody chimes
Berit Opheim – voice, melody chimes

References

ECM Records albums
ECM New Series albums
2014 albums
Albums produced by Manfred Eicher